The British Columbia Intercollegiate Hockey League (BCIHL) is a university hockey league

based in British Columbia. The BCIHL was created with the purpose of offering a venue for competitive, high-calibre hockey for players beyond their junior hockey careers.

The league operates as one of two Division 2 leagues in Canada when compared to the Division 1 U Sports league, the other being Alberta's ACAC. BCIHL teams, however, regularly play U Sports and NCAA teams.

In a typical season, each BCIHL team plays a 24-game league schedule, with the top four teams qualifying for the playoffs. Beginning in 2012, the playoff format has consisted of a best-of-three semifinal round, and a best-of-three championship series. Prior to 2012 the championship had been decided through a round-robin tournament.

History
In 2011, the BCIHL accepted its first US-based team in Eastern Washington University, which had previously played in the American Collegiate Hockey Association at the Division II level. Before 2011, the BCIHL consisted entirely of teams from British Columbia.

The 2016–17 season would see the BCIHL get its first NHL alumni as former Montreal Canadiens forward Patrick Holland would join the University of Victoria.

Vancouver Island University was confirmed as the sixth team to join the BCIHL in 2017, and joined the league for the 2017/2018 season.

In 2019, Trinity Western University's men's and women's hockey programs were officially accepted into the Canada West Universities Athletic Association starting in the 2020-21 season. The Spartans would finish their final season in the BCIHL as regular season champions.

In March 2021, Selkirk College announced it would be discontinuing the Saints men's hockey program due to budget constraints as a result of the COVID-19 pandemic. This departure marked the first time a former BCIHL Champion has dissolved.

On June 22, 2021, the Okanagan Lakers were added to the BCIHL via expansion and became the leagues first ever independent club, consisting of student-athletes from both the University of British Columbia-Okanagan and Okanagan College. The team is slated to join the league for the 2021-22 regular season.

On February 8, 2022, the Logan Lake Miners were added to the BCIHL via expansion, consisting of student-athletes from Thompson Rivers University in Kamloops, BC, and the Nicola Valley Institute of Technology in Merritt, BC. The team will play out of the Logan Lake Recreation Centre starting in the 2022/23 season.

In addition to the Okanagan Lakers, the BCIHL is currently reviewing expansion proposals for two other teams: the Thompson Okanagan Pioneers and the Fraser Valley College Brigade.

Teams

Former teams

Championship Results by Year

Notable players
Patrick Holland - Montreal Canadiens
Jordan Wood - Huntsville Havoc
Anthony Collins - Rapid City Rush
James Isaacs - Fife Flyers

References

External links
 British Columbia Intercollegiate Hockey League
 Simon Fraser Hockey
 Victoria Vikes Hockey
VIU Mariners Hockey
Okanagan Lakers Hockey
Former Teams
Trinity Western Spartans Hockey
Selkirks Saints

Ice hockey leagues in British Columbia
College athletics conferences in Canada
University and college sports in Canada
2006 establishments in British Columbia
Sports leagues established in 2006